George Bridges Brudenell  (23 February 1726 – 1 February 1801) was a British politician who sat in the House of Commons for 36 years from 1754 to 1790.

Early life
Brudenall was the son of James Brudenell MP and his wife Susanna Burton, daughter of Bartholomew Burton of North Luffenham, Rutland. He was educated at Hackney and was admitted at Peterhouse, Cambridge on 7 April 1743. He succeeded his father in 1746 and was equerry to King George II from 1746 to 1760.

Political career
Brudenell's political career was effectively run by Lord Exeter. He was returned unopposed as Member of Parliament for Rutland in a by-election in 1754. In 1756, he received a secret service pension of £500 per year. When King George III came to the throne in 1760, he was offered the renewal of his place as equerry, but did not press to take it. Because Exeter wanted to place his brother at Rutland at the next election Brudenell was transferred to Stamford for the 1761 general election where he was returned unopposed.

He was appointed clerk comptroller of the Household in July 1765 and held the post until 1768. At the 1768 general election he returned to Rutland where he became MP  without opposition. He was appointed Clerk of the Green Cloth in 1768 and held the post until it was abolished in March 1782. He was returned unopposed for Rutland in the subsequent elections in 1774,  1780 and 1784. He did not stand in 1790. There is no record of his having spoken in the House

Later life and legacy
Brudenell died on  1 February 1801.

References

1726 births
1801 deaths
British MPs 1754–1761
British MPs 1761–1768
British MPs 1768–1774
British MPs 1774–1780
British MPs 1780–1784
British MPs 1784–1790
Members of the Parliament of Great Britain for English constituencies